Lipová is a village and small municipality in Bardejov District in the Prešov Region of north-east Slovakia.

History
In historical records the village was first mentioned in 1567.

Geography
The municipality lies at an altitude of 288 metres and covers an area of 3.92 km².
It has a population of about 94 people. However, the population that remains in the village year-round is approximately 80.  But it is a very nice place to relax and for short walks  through the forests.

References

External links
https://web.archive.org/web/20080111223415/http://www.statistics.sk/mosmis/eng/run.html

Villages and municipalities in Bardejov District
Šariš